The following lists events that happened in 1991 in Iceland.

Incumbents
President – Vigdís Finnbogadóttir 
Prime Minister – Steingrímur Hermannsson, Davíð Oddsson

Events
20 April – Icelandic parliamentary election, 1991

Births

26 February – Björn Bergmann Sigurðarson, footballer.
16 March – Arnar Darri Pétursson, footballer
8 April – Dröfn Haraldsdóttir, handball player
10 May – Ægir Steinarsson, basketball player
28 June – Jóhanna María Sigmundsdóttir, politician.
2 August – Hrafnhildur Lúthersdóttir, swimmer.
10 August – Dagný Brynjarsdóttir, footballer
1 September – Haukur Heiðar Hauksson, footballer
15 November – Helga Margrét Þorsteinsdóttir, heptathlete

Deaths
1 September – Hannibal Valdimarsson, politician (b. 1903).

4 April – Pálmi Jónsson, businessman and entrepreneur (b. 1923)

References

 
1990s in Iceland
Iceland
Iceland
Years of the 20th century in Iceland